The Asia Professional Baseball Championship 2017 (APBC 2017), sanctioned by the World Baseball Softball Confederation (WBSC), was the first edition of APBC, and was held in Japan from November 16 to 19.

Participating teams

Rosters

Only players born in 1993 or later, or that have less than three years of professional experience are eligible for the competition. However, teams are also allowed up to three wild cards which do not meet either of these criteria. Korea is the only team to have elected not to use its wild cards.

Format 
Each of the three teams participated in a round-robin series, playing each other team once. The two teams with the best win-loss percentage faced each other in the final, with the team finishing higher considered the "home team", meaning that they had the advantage of batting last.

Round-robin stage

Final

Final standings

Awards
The APBC 2017 organization announced MVP and All APBC 2017 team of Asia Professional Baseball Championship 2017 as follows.

References

External links

Asia Professional Baseball Championship
Asia Professional Baseball Championship
Asia Professional Baseball Championship
Asia Professional Baseball Championship
Asia Professional Baseball Championship